Ihor Bohach (born 3 May 1996) is a professional Ukrainian football midfielder.

Career
Bohach is the product of the Karpaty Lviv School System and then played for FC Karpaty in the Ukrainian Premier League Reserves and Under 19 Championship during 3 seasons.

He made his debut for FC Karpaty as a substituted player in a game against FC Shakhtar Donetsk on 12 August 2016 in the Ukrainian Premier League.

References

External links
Statistics at UAF website (Ukr)

 

1996 births
Living people
Ukrainian footballers
Association football midfielders
FC Karpaty Lviv players
FC Polissya Zhytomyr players
FC Nyva Vinnytsia players
FC Kalush players
Ukrainian Premier League players
Ukrainian Second League players